Life Is a Dream (German: Das Leben ein Traum) is a 1917 German silent drama film directed by Robert Wiene and starring Emil Jannings, Bruno Decarli and Maria Fein. A young aristocrat meets a man and marries him, but soon discovers he is a monster. After his death she grows increasingly mad, until a revolutionary new cure is attempted which makes her believe that the whole episode was simply a dream.

Cast
 Emil Jannings   
 Bruno Decarli   
 Maria Fein   
 Alexander Antalffy   
 Emil Rameau

References

Bibliography
 Jung, Uli & Schatzberg, Walter. Beyond Caligari: The Films of Robert Wiene. Berghahn Books, 1999.

External links

1917 films
German silent feature films
German drama films
Films of the German Empire
Films directed by Robert Wiene
1917 drama films
German black-and-white films
Silent drama films
1910s German films
1910s German-language films